The Almo Collegio Capranica is the oldest Roman college, founded in 1457 by Cardinal Domenico Capranica (1400–1458) in his own palace for thirty young clerics, who received an education suitable to prepare them for the priesthood.

History

 
 
The Capranica College is located in the Piazza Capranica, in the Colonna district. The Capranica family made their fortunes under Pope Martin V (Oddone Colonna). Domenico Capranica (1400-1458), was a cardinal and a humanist. Upon the death of Martin V, conflict arose between the rival Colonna and Orsini families. Capranica, who was often away on assignments for the papacy, found his home stripped and decided to build a new one.

Around 1449 Cardinal Domenico Capranica began construction of his palace by buying some houses near the parish church of St. Mary in Aquiro, in the square that now bears his name. Among the buildings acquired there was a chapel, which tradition says was built on the site of the birthplace of St. Agnes, who would have suffered martyrdom in the nearby stadium of Domitian.

He founded the college in January 1457, with the aim of offering the opportunity of a proper education for the priesthood to young poor of the city of Rome. He opened it in his own palace for thirty-one poor scholars, sixteen in theology and the liberal arts, and fifteen in canon law. In this he anticipated by more than a century the establishment of "seminaries" decreed by the Council of Trent. The institution was the first of its kind in Rome;  initially reserved for young Romans, it later extended hospitality to students from other Italian regions and of different nationalities.

Capranica himself drew up their rules and presented the college with his own library, the more valuable portion of which was later transferred to the Vatican. The curriculum included the study of Aristotle and Aquinas. It was expected that over the holidays, students would gain experience by serving in the cathedral or in other local churches.

When the Constable de Bourbon laid siege to Rome in 1527, the Capranica students were among the few defenders of the Porta di S. Spirito, and all of them with their rector died when Rome was breached. The word "Almo" ("who gives life") in the title remembers them. The rector, according to the university custom of those days, was elected by the students and was always one of them until Pope Alexander VII decided that the rector should be appointed by the protectors of the college. In 1971 Pope Paul VI instituted an Episcopal Commission, composed of three former students, a cardinal and two bishops to direct the seminary.

After the French Revolution, the college was re-established in 1807; the number of free students was reduced to 13, but paying students were admitted. The College was closed from 1798 to 1807, during the Roman Republic.

Currently, the college has about fifty students, primarily from dioceses in Italy. There are also Orthodox pupils and students from Eastern Catholic Churches. Some students are preparing for the priesthood, others, already priests, continue their postgraduate studies. Typically a Capranica student enters the College during the years of preparation for ordination and remains there until the completion of his specialization. The college's patroness is St. Agnes.

Building
The original one-story building probably had the workshops on the ground floor, with the living quarters and state rooms on the main floor. After the death of Domenico in 1458, his brother Angelo, also a cardinal, enlarged the palace, but reserved part of the building for the family, who later created a theatre from existing family apartments without changing the exterior of the building.

The facade facing the square, is covered with light plaster and is characterized by the presence of the square tower, ending with a loggia that opens to the outside with two arched windows on each side. The current façade is not the original one but the result of renovations mainly in seventeenth century, during which as additional floor was added.

Chapel of St. Agnes
This chapel is commonly believed to be the oldest place of worship dedicated to the martyr.

The main chapel of the College, dedicated to St. Agnes, was restored in 1954 in neo-Renaissance style. The walls are covered with polychrome marble and decorated with a double cornice. The semicircular apse contains Antoniazzo Romano's fresco of  Madonna with Child, a holy bishop and St. Agnes. Stained glass windows depict St. Gregory the Great, St. Augustine, St. Jerome and St. Ambrose. The pipe organ is a Mascioni (Opus 696) manufactured in 1953.

Alumni
The Capranica has produced many notable ecclesiastics, including Popes Benedict XV and Pius XII, numerous cardinals, and Blessed Luigi Novarese

 Card Pietro Pavan (1903–1994)
 Card Antonio Vico (1847–1929)
 Card Alessandro Sanminiatelli Zabarella (1840 — 1910)
 Arch Alfonso Carinci (1862–1963) Secretary S.C. dei Riti (1945–1960) Rector of the Capranica (1911–1930)

See also
Roman Colleges

References

External links
 Official Site of the Almo Collegio Capranica
 Pope John Paul II, Address to the Community of Almo Collegio Capranica, January 19, 2002, Libreria Editrice Vaticana 
 Interactive Nolli Map Website

Rome R. III Colonna
Roman Colleges
15th-century establishments in Italy
Educational institutions established in the 15th century
Religious organizations established in the 1450s
1457 establishments in Europe